Charles Ravier (5 June 1934 – 5 March 1984) was a 20th-century French composer, music director and choral conductor.

Biography 
Born in Savigny-sur-Grosne in Saône-et-Loire, Charles Ravier first studied the violin, then entered the conservatoire de Lyon where in won prizes in harmony, counterpoint and fugue. He was interested in polyphonic music, and particularly in the early repertoire of the Middle Ages in the 17th century. At the end of the 1950s, he formed the Ensemble Polyphonique de la RTF, and performed with this group the music by Guillaume de Machaut, Clément Janequin, Gesualdo, Claudio Monteverdi among others. Interested in the works of Safford Cape, he chose to have the vocal pieces of the Renaissance, and mainly the songs of the 16th century, interpreted by one voice per vocal part. As a composer he is the author of the pieces Les Espaces oubliés, Les chemins de l'imaginaire, L'Apocalypse d'Angers, and Liturgie pour un Dieu mort (cantata). He also premiered contemporary works by Girolamo Arrigo and Sylvano Bussotti. He died in Paris as a result of suicide by jumping.

Bibliography 
 Alain Pâris, notice "Charles Ravier" in Dictionnaire des interprètes et de l'interprétation musicale, Éditions Robert Laffont, series "Bouquin" 1989.

References

External links 
 Charles Ravier's discography on Discogs
  Charles Ravier, Ensemble Polyphonique Of The French National Radio on Discogs
 CLÉMENT JANEQUIN "Guillot ung jour" Attaingnant , 1540 direction Charles Ravier on YouTube
 Charles Ravier on IdRef
 Charles Ravier on data.bnf.fr

1934 births
1984 deaths
People from Saône-et-Loire
French choral conductors
French male conductors (music)
20th-century French composers
Suicides by jumping in France
20th-century French conductors (music)
20th-century French male musicians